Opcode Systems, Inc. was founded in 1985 by Dave Oppenheim and based in and around Palo Alto, California, USA.  Opcode produced MIDI sequencing software for the classic Mac OS and Microsoft Windows, which would later include digital audio capabilities, as well as audio and MIDI hardware interfaces.  Opcode's MIDIMAC sequencer, launched in 1986, was the first commercially available MIDI sequencer for the Macintosh.

History 

In 1985, Stanford University graduate Dave Oppenheim founded Opcode.  Dave was the majority partner, focusing on Research & Development, with Gary Briber the minority partner focusing on Sales & Marketing. Paul J. de Benedictis joined the company to write product manuals, test products and demo the products after meeting Ray Spears in San Francisco while he was printing the beta manual for MIDIMAC Sequencer v1.0. The products were announced at the New Orleans Summer NAMM (June 22–25) (after which Apple objected to the name) and, according to composer Laurie Spiegel, publicly available in July, 1985.

In 1986, two major products were released.  One was the MIDIMAC Sequencer, which later became the Opcode Sequencer and, eventually, Vision.  The other was the MIDIMAC interface for the Macintosh computer.  These products allowed musicians to use the Macintosh platform for music sequencing and were utilized by electronic music pioneers such as Herbie Hancock, Wendy Carlos, Thomas Dolby, and others.

In 1986, music software programmer David Zicarelli licensed his Editor/Librarian for the Yamaha DX-7 to Opcode, which published this product.  At its peak, Opcode would market over ten separate Editor/Librarians, software programs designed to facilitate the editing of sound patches for digital synthesizers and the storage and organization of those patches on a personal computer.
 
In 1987, Gary Briber sold his portion of the company to Chris Halaby, with Chris assuming the position of Chief Executive Officer and Marketing and Sales responsibilities falling upon Paul J. de Benedictis and Keith Borman, respectively. Paul de Benedictis was also the product manager for many of the products including the new version of Opcode's sequencer, Vision.

In 1989, Opcode introduced Vision, its award-winning sequencing platform for the Macintosh (and, eventually, Windows computers as well). A simplified version, EZ Vision, was soon released. EZ Vision's successor, MusicShop, included a simple notation view - a first in a sequencing product in that price range (roughly $100 US).

Also in 1989, it licensed the computer music authoring system Max from IRCAM, where it had been developed academically by Miller Puckette. Opcode began selling a commercial version of the program in 1990, developed and extended by David Zicarelli. Never a perfect fit for Opcode Systems, active development on the software ceased in the mid-90s. The current commercial version of Max has since been maintained and distributed by Zicarelli's company, Cycling '74 (founded in 1997), since 1999.

In 1990, Opcode introduced Studio Vision (initially called 'Audio Vision'), which added digital audio recording (using Digidesign's digital audio hardware) to Vision's recording and editing platform.  Studio Vision was the first-ever commercially available product integrating MIDI sequencing and digital audio editing and recording on a personal computer. Paul J. de Benedictis was the Studio Vision product manager and helped come up with the idea of audio and MIDI in the same product after speaking with Mark Jeffery, a Digidesign employee key to their software development.  A version called VisionDSP was released just before the company folded. Caitlin Johnson Bini, Senior Tech Writer, wrote the Studio Vision, Vision, EZ Vision, and Galaxy user manuals.

Opcode's hardware products included a line of serial MIDI interfaces which included the Studio 3, Studio 4, Studio 5, Studio 64X and 128X, as well as USB interfaces including the DATport, SONICport, MIDIport and STUDIOport lines.

In 1998, Opcode was bought by Gibson Guitar Corporation. Development on Opcode products ceased in 1999.

References

External links
Dave Oppenheim Interview for the NAMM Oral History Program (2012)
Paul de Benedictis Interview for the NAMM Oral History Program (2009)

MIDI